I predoni del Sahara (Raiders of the Sahara) is a 1965 Italian adventure film directed by Guido Malatesta.

Cast
George Mikell as Ronald Wayne
Pamela Tudor as Dorothy Flatters
William Stockridge as James Stanton
John Drake as Daniel Flatters
Farida Fahmy as Aisha 
Carlo Tamberlani as Lord Flatters
Enzo Fiermonte
Nello Pazzafini as Hamid

External links
 

1965 films
Italian adventure films
1960s Italian-language films
Films directed by Guido Malatesta
Films based on Italian novels
Films based on works by Emilio Salgari
1960s Italian films